Athletic Park was a ballpark in Los Angeles, California, United States. Tenants include the Los Angeles Seraphs, Los Angeles Angels. It was the site of the first professional night game on the Pacific coast, which took place on July 2, 1893.

USC played football games against Occidental College, Caltech, Los Angeles High School and Los Angeles Athletic Club at Athletic Park between 1895 and 1898.

An 1894 city map shows Athletic Park bounded by Seventh Street (south), Alameda Street (west) and Mateo Street (east), with Palmetto Street a block's width away to the north.

References

External links
Sanborn map showing Athletic Park, 1894

American football venues in Los Angeles
Baseball venues in Los Angeles
Defunct college football venues
USC Trojans football venues